Pachylaelaps is a genus of mites in the family Pachylaelapidae. There are more than 50 described species in Pachylaelaps.

Species
These 55 species belong to the genus Pachylaelaps:

 Pachylaelaps armimagnus Mašán, 2007
 Pachylaelaps atlanticus Mašán & Halliday, 2014
 Pachylaelaps australicus Womersley, 1942
 Pachylaelaps bellicosus Berlese, 1920
 Pachylaelaps bifurciger Berlese, 1920
 Pachylaelaps bocharovae Koroleva, 1978
 Pachylaelaps buyakovae Goncharova & Koroleva, 1974
 Pachylaelaps carpathicus Mašán, 2007
 Pachylaelaps carpathimagnus Mašán, 2007
 Pachylaelaps changbaiensis Chen, Bei & Gao, 2009
 Pachylaelaps citri Olivier & Loots, 1970
 Pachylaelaps conifer Hirschmann & Krauss, 1965
 Pachylaelaps decipiens Hirschmann & Krauss, 1965
 Pachylaelaps denticulatus Hirschmann & Krauss, 1965
 Pachylaelaps distinctus Mašán, 2007
 Pachylaelaps dubius Hirschmann & Krauss, 1965
 Pachylaelaps ensifer Oudemans, 1902
 Pachylaelaps evansi Costa, 1971
 Pachylaelaps femoralis Bhattacharyya, 1970
 Pachylaelaps gallicus Berlese, 1920
 Pachylaelaps gibbosus Hirschmann & Krauss, 1965
 Pachylaelaps grandis Koroleva, 1977
 Pachylaelaps granulifer Hirschmann & Krauss, 1965
 Pachylaelaps hamifer Trägårdh, 1931
 Pachylaelaps hestulifer Hirschmann & Krauss, 1965
 Pachylaelaps imitans Berlese, 1920
 Pachylaelaps insularis Berlese, 1920
 Pachylaelaps kirghizorum Koroleva, 1977
 Pachylaelaps koroljevae Alexandrova, 1980
 Pachylaelaps littoralis Halbert, 1915
 Pachylaelaps longicrinitus Hirschmann & Krauss, 1965
 Pachylaelaps longisetis Halbert, 1915
 Pachylaelaps longulus Willmann, 1938
 Pachylaelaps multidentatus Evans & Hyatt, 1956
 Pachylaelaps neoxenillitus Ma, 1997
 Pachylaelaps nuditectus Ma & Yin, 2000
 Pachylaelaps obirensis Schmölzer, 1992
 Pachylaelaps pectinifer (G. Canestrini, 1881)
 Pachylaelaps perlucidus Mašán, 2007
 Pachylaelaps pulsator Hirschmann & Krauss, 1965
 Pachylaelaps quadricombinatus Gu, Huang & Li, 1991
 Pachylaelaps resinae Karg, 1971
 Pachylaelaps sacculimagnus Mašán, 2007
 Pachylaelaps similis Mašán & Halliday, 2013
 Pachylaelaps silviae Moraza & Peña, 2005
 Pachylaelaps squamifer Berlese, 1920
 Pachylaelaps sublongisetis Koroleva, 1977
 Pachylaelaps terreus Mašán, 2007
 Pachylaelaps tetragonoides (Dugès, 1834)
 Pachylaelaps tianschanicus Koroleva, 1977
 Pachylaelaps troglophilus Willmann, 1940
 Pachylaelaps turgidus Vitzthum, 1926
 Pachylaelaps undulatus Evans & Hyatt, 1956
 Pachylaelaps vicarius Mašán, 2007
 Pachylaelaps virago Berlese, 1920
 Pachylaelaps xenillitus Ma, 1985

References

Pachylaelapidae
Articles created by Qbugbot